Katy Daley-McLean  (born 19 December 1985) is an English retired rugby union player, who captained England Women. She also featured for Loughborough Lightning.

Playing career
She played for England as captain and at fly-half for the Loughborough Lightning in the Premier 15s. As captain, Daley-McLean led England to victory against Canada in the final of the 2014 Women's Rugby World Cup held in France. She was thereafter bestowed with an MBE in the 2014 New Year Honours. As a part of Team Great Britain, Daley-McLean also placed fourth, at the 2016 Summer Olympics held in Rio De Janeiro, Brazil.

McLean was later named in the squad for the 2017 Women's Rugby World Cup in Ireland. In December 2020, she brought her international career to a close.

Personal life
Katy graduated from the University of Sunderland with a BSc in Sports Studies in 2007. During 2015 she was made an honorary fellow of the University. She also works as a professional teacher.

References

External links 
 
 
 
 

1985 births
Living people
Alumni of the University of Sunderland
England women's international rugby union players
England international women's rugby sevens players
English female rugby union players
Great Britain national rugby sevens team players
Members of the Order of the British Empire
Olympic rugby sevens players of Great Britain
Rugby sevens players at the 2016 Summer Olympics
Rugby union players from South Shields